Centreville Layton School is a private Delaware school for children with diverse learning styles. Centreville Layton School offers a robust educational and cultural experience for students who learn differently. The program identifies academic and social needs of the individual and provides a curriculum that focuses on problem solving and critical thinking.

History
Centreville Layton School is the result of the merger between Centreville School (est. 1974) and Layton Preparatory School.

Admission

Centreville Layton School students may face challenges in one or more of the following areas:
 Language processing difficulties
 Dyslexia
 Difficulties with spelling, reading, writing, and math
 Fine and gross motor skill delays
 Executive functioning disorder
 Social skills
 Anxiety
 Receptive and expressive language disorders
 Peer relationships
 School-related apprehension
 Attention issues such as ADHD

Accreditations 

Middle States Association of Colleges and Schools
Delaware Department of Education

References

External links

Educational institutions established in 1974
Private elementary schools in Delaware
Schools in Wilmington, Delaware
Schools in New Castle County, Delaware
Special schools in the United States
Private middle schools in Delaware